Toni Lindenhahn (born 15 November 1990) is a German professional footballer who plays as a right midfielder or right-back for Hallescher FC.

Playing career
Lindenhahn came through Hallescher FC's youth system. He was promoted to the first team in 2009 and was a key part of the team that earned promotion to the 3. Liga in 2012. He played in the club's first game at this level, a 1–0 win over Kickers Offenbach.

References

External links

1990 births
Living people
German footballers
Germany youth international footballers
Hallescher FC players
3. Liga players
Association football midfielders